Ayah may refer to:

 Ayah, a verse of the Qur'an
 Ayah or Amah (occupation), a domestic servant
 Paul Abine Ayah (21st century), member of the National Assembly of Cameroon
 Princess Ayah bint Al Faisal (born 1990), Jordanian princess
 Ayah Marar (born 1980), singer
 Ayah meant "nanny" in India during the colonial period
Ayah means "father" in Indonesian